Sahibzada Habib-ur-Rahman Qalandar Momand (September 1, 1930 - February 4, 2003) was a well-known Pashto poet, short story writer, journalist and linguist.

Books

Short stories
Gajre

Poetry
Sabāʼūn
Raṇāʼī

Essays
Daryāb : Puṣhto lughat, Pushto dictionary
Paṭah khazānah fī al-mīzān, critical study of Paṭah khazānah, a Pushto work containing biographies of early Pushto poets, by Muḥammad Hotak, 18thrks of 20th century Pushto poets from Pakistan, includes their brief biographical sketches, collected articles previously published in Pushto magazines from 1950 to 2001
Da Khayr al-Bayān tanqīdī mut̤ālaʻah, critical study of Khayr al-Bayān, a Pushto work on Islamic precepts by Pīr Roṣhān Bāyazīd Anṣārī, fl. 1526-1572
Da Arist̤ū Naẓmīyāt tashrīḥ aw tabṣirah, commentary on Aristotle's Poetics
Tanqīd : talkhīṣ aw tanqiyyah, on literary criticism

References

External links
Khyber Watch Article

1930 births
2003 deaths
Pashtun people
Pashtun writers
Pashto-language poets
Pashto-language writers
Linguists from Pakistan
Communist Party of Pakistan politicians
20th-century linguists